Mozhaysky (masculine), Mozhayskaya (feminine), or Mozhayskoye (neuter) may refer to:
Mozhaysky District, several districts in Russia
Mozhaysky Municipal Okrug, a municipal formation which Mozhaysky District of the federal city of Moscow, Russia is incorporated as
Mozhaysky (rural locality) (Mozhayskoye, Mozhayskaya), several rural localities in Russia
 Alexander Mozhaysky, Russian military officer and inventor